Kupea is a monotypic moth genus of the family Crambidae described by Alfred Philpott in 1930. It contains only one species, Kupea electilis, also known as Kupe's grassmoth, which is endemic to New Zealand. It is classified as Nationally Vulnerable by the Department of Conservation. The female of the species was first discovered in 2012.

Taxonomy
Kupea electilis was first described by Alfred Philpott in 1930 using a male specimen collected at Birdling's Flat, Kaitorete Spit by Stuart Lindsay in March. The species was again described and figured by George Vernon Hudson in 1939. David E. Gaskin discussed the species in 1975 stating that once a female specimen was found the systemic position of the genus should be reassessed. The type specimen is held at the Canterbury Museum.

Description
The adult male's forewings are brassy ochreous, suffused with grey in the disc. There is a brownish-black mark in the disc, followed by a white bar. The hindwings are brownish. The male has a limited ability to fly. The female of the species is brachypterous.

Distribution
Kupea electilis is endemic to New Zealand. It has only ever been recorded on sites around Kaitorete Spit, Canterbury. The female of the species was first discovered in 2012.

Life history
The larvae exist in a cocoon constructed of silk and sand. They feed on dried pieces of their host plant within the cocoon. Adults are on the wing from mid March to mid April. The time they are active is unknown as K. electilis are not attracted to light but it has been hypothesised they are active at twilight.

Habitat and host plant
This species occurs at sand plains, behind foredunes and low hind dunes. The host of this species is the endemic plant Zoysia minima.

Conservation status
Kupea electilis is regarded as being "Nationally Vulnerable" under the New Zealand Threat Classification System. The main threats to this species include grazing cattle and introduced pests such as rabbits that eat its host plant, weed invasion from plants such as sea spurge, and the development or use of land by humans.

References

External links

Image of female of the species

Crambinae
Moths of New Zealand
Endemic fauna of New Zealand
Endangered biota of New Zealand
Taxa named by Alfred Philpott
Endemic moths of New Zealand